The History of Nordic Women's Literature (Danish: Nordisk kvindelitteraturhistorie, Swedish: Nordisk kvinnolitteraturhistoria) is a print and online encyclopedia and biographical dictionary about female Nordic authors.

The original print version was written in five volumes (four encyclopedic volumes plus a "bio-bibliographical" volume) over 25 years by about 100 scholars from different Nordic countries. The first volume was published in 1993 in Swedish and Danish and the last in 1998. A digital version was released in Danish, Swedish, and English in 2012.  the online version hosts 235 articles and bibliographical information for 821 writers. It is searchable and organized by name, country, period, and keyword. Each of the four encyclopedic volumes comprises topic-based articles, often grouped thematically. The third volume, for example, is divided into "self", "desire", and "gender and the war".

The work covers authors from Sweden, Norway, Finland, Denmark, Iceland, Greenland, Faroe Islands, and Åland. The information on the authors in the online version is updated as necessary but no new authors (in addition to those included in the book version) are to be included as Kvinfo is planning a project on new women authors.

The Danish and English versions of the work are published and owned by Kvinfo, the Danish Centre for Information on Gender, Equality, and Ethnicity in Copenhagen while the Swedish version is published and owned by KvinnSam, the National Resource Library for Gender Studies in Gothenburg. It is funded by Riksbankens Jubileumsfond (Sweden) and the A.P. Møller & Chastine Mc-Kinney Møller Foundation (Denmark).

References

Bibliography
The Danish book edition is contained in the five volumes cited below:

External links
 (English language version)
Writing a Women's Literary History: The Nordic Experience by editor Elisabeth Moller Jensen

Swedish online encyclopedias
Encyclopedias of literature
Nordic literature
Swedish women writers
Danish women writers
Finnish women writers
-
Biographical dictionaries
1993 non-fiction books
Multilingual websites